The Sinulog-Santo Niño Festival is an annual cultural and religious festival held on the third Sunday of January in Cebu City and is the centre of the Santo Niño Catholic Christian celebrations in the Philippines.

The festival is considered to be the biggest festival in the Philippines, with every celebration of the festival routinely attracting between 1 million and 1.5 million people each year. Aside from the religious aspect of the festival, Sinulog is also famous for its street parties, usually happening the night before and the night of the main festival. The festival is nicknamed the "Grandest Festival in the Philippines."

Other places in the Philippines also celebrate their own version of the festival in honor of Santo Niño, both within Cebu like Carmen, and outside Cebu, including Tondo, Manila, Kabankalan, General Santos, Maasin, Cagayan de Oro, Butuan, Pagadian, and Balingasag, Misamis Oriental.

Etymology 

The word Sinulog comes from the Cebuano adverb sulog, roughly meaning "like water current movement;" describing the forward-backward dance movements. The dance consists of two steps forward and one step backward, done to the sound of drums. The dance is categorized into Sinulog-base, free-interpretation, and street dancing. Candle vendors at the Basilica continue to perform the traditional version of the dance when lighting a candle for the customer, usually accompanied by songs sang in Cebuano.

Sinulog is the ritual prayer-dance honoring Señor Santo Niño or the Child Jesus. An image of the Child Jesus is said to be the baptismal gift the Portuguese conquistador Ferdinand Magellan gave to Hara Amihan (Humanay) of Zebu (now Cebu) in April 1521. The image, believed to be miraculous, is housed at the Basilica Minore del Santo Niño in downtown Cebu City.

The Sinulog dance moves are often identified to be two steps forward and one step backward as the dancer sways to a distinct rhythm of drums. This movement is made to resemble the current (sulog) of what was known as Cebu's Pahina River.

According to historical accounts, Cebuanos had already performed dances similar to the Sinulog to honor animist idols long before the introduction of Christianity to the Philippines, which arrived in Cebu with the arrival of Ferdinand Magellan who led a Spanish expedition on April 7, 1521. The original image of Santo Niño was said to have been left by members of the Magellan expedition, and were said to be rediscovered when the Spanish returned in 1565 in an expedition led by Miguel López de Legazpi, which eventually led to the Spanish colonial era in the Philippines.

Today the Sinulog commemorates the Filipino people's acceptance of Christianity (specifically, Roman Catholicism), and their rejection of their former animist beliefs (worship of nature). The first of these conversions happened in 1521 on the island of Cebu, when Indianized-Sanskritized ruler Rajah Humabon and his queen Amihan (Humamay) were baptized along with their subjects, becoming Carlos and Juana of Cebu.

History

On March 16, 1521, the Portuguese explorer Ferdinand Magellan arrived and planted the cross on the shores of Cebu, claiming the territory for Spain. He presented the image of the Child Jesus to the Rajah Humabon. Hara Humamay (or Amihan in some versions) was later named, Queen Juana after Juana, mother of Carlos I. along with the rulers of the island and some 800 natives were also converted to the Roman Catholic faith.

This event is frequently used as basis for most Sinulog dances, which dramatize the coming of the Spaniards and the presentation of the Santo Niño to the Queen. A popular theme among Sinulog dances is Queen Juana holding the Santo Niño in her arms and using it to bless her people who were often afflicted with sickness believed to be caused by demons and other evil spirits.

The Sinulog dance steps are believed to originate from Rajah Humabon's adviser, Baladhay. It was during Humabon's grief when Baladhay fell sick. Humabon ordered his native tribe to bring Baladhay into a room where the Santo Niño was enthroned, along with the other pagan gods of the native Cebuanos. After a few days passed, Baladhay was heard shouting and was found dancing with utmost alertness. Baladhay was questioned as to why was he was awake and shouting. Pointing to the image of the Santo Niño, Baladhay explained that he had found on top of him a small child trying to wake him and tickling him with the midrib of the coconut. Greatly astonished, he scared the child away by shouting. The little child got up and started making fun of Baladhay. In turn, Baladhay danced with the little child and explained that he was dancing the movements of the river. To this day, the two-steps forward, one-step backward movement is still used by Santo Niño devotees who believe that it was the Santo Niño's choice to have Baladhay dance.

Arrival of López de Legazpi
'The expedition led by Miguel Lopez de Legazpi bombarded the native settlement when they arrived on April 28, 1565. In one of the burning huts, one of Legazpi's men, Juan Camus, discovered the image of the Santo Niño inside a wooden box beside other idols. This time however, Legazpi discovered that the natives already dance the Sinulog honoring the Santo Niño.

The Augustinian friars that accompanied López de Legazpi in his expedition built a church on the site where it was found. The church was called San Agustin Church, later renamed to Basilica Minore del Santo Niño.

Letter to the King of Spain
After Juan Camus found the Santo Niño in the burning village, López de Legazpi was said to have included the incident in his report, entitled "Relation of Voyage to the Philippine Islands":"Your Excellency should know that on that day when we entered this village (Cebu City), one of the soldiers went into a large and well-built house of an indio where he found an image of the Child Jesus (whose Most Holy Name I pray may be universally worshipped). This was kept in its cradle, all gilded, just as if it were brought from Spain: and only the little cross, which is generally placed upon the globe in his hands, was lacking. The image was well kept in that house, and many flowers were found before it, and no one knows for what object or purpose. The soldier bowed down before it with all reverence and wonder, and brought the image to the place where the other soldiers were. I pray to the Holy Name of his image, which we found here, to help us and to grant us victory, in order that these lost people who are ignorant of the precious and rich treasure, which was in their possession, may come to knowledge to him.''"

Today
Since the 16th century, there is great devotion to the Santo Niño in Philippine popular piety, particularly in the Visayas. Pilgrims from different parts of Cebu and the rest of the Philippines make their yearly journey to the church to take part in the procession and festival. Starting in 1980, the Cebu City government organized the Sinulog Festival and eventually gave incentives also to tribal dance groups. The first Sinulog parade was held in 1980, organized by Dávid Odilao, then Regional Director of the Ministry of Sports, and Youth Development. The parade was composed of students dressed in Knitted Filipiniana costumes, dancing the Sinulog to the beating of drums.

The idea caught and thus, under the direction of the Cebu City Mayor Florentino Solon with the help of several influential Cebuanos, Odilao turned over the Sinulog project to the Cebu City Historical Committee under Kagawad Jesus Garcia. It was the task of the committee to conceptualize the Sinulog festival and make it into a yearly event from then on.

In 1981 the following year, the concept of the Sinulog Parade was actualized involving not just Cebu but also representatives from other provinces in the Philippines . Marking its difference from another popular festival, the Ati-Atihan in Aklan, the Sinulog focuses not on the ritual itself but on the historical aspects of the dance, which, as it has been said, represents the link the country's embrace of Christian faith.

2010-2014 Peace and Order during Sinulog celebration was an issue for years. Gangs and fraternity wars were rampant during night times. The organization of AITF under the leadership of PCI Franz Georsua became the key to a peaceful and more meaningful celebration after controlling most of the street crimes during the said event.

The Devotee City, a temporary accommodation place consisting of reused shipping containers, has also been created since 1995 to accommodate devotees from far-flung areas who do not have any accommodation within Cebu City or other nearby areas. It is located in the open space surrounding the Compania Maritima building, and is only a few meters away from the Magellan's Cross and the Basilica del Santo Niño.

In 2021, the festival was cancelled because of the COVID-19 pandemic and the next year it was cancelled again after the devastation of Typhoon Rai.

Sinulog logo

The Cebu City Historical Committee, which was responsible for the conceptualization of the Sinulog as a provincial event, decided to adopt a logo to identify it as an institutionalized yearly event. They turned to the coat of arms of the Santo Niño which consisted of a two-headed hawk that was the mark of the ruling House of Habsburg in Europe. The emblem represented the twin purpose of the Habsburg dynasty as "Champion of Catholicism and Defender of the Faith." At the time when Spain sent expeditions to the Philippines, they were under the Habsburg dynasty. The committee viewed that using the image of the Santo Niño as part of the symbol as sacrilege.

The Sinulog committee then incorporated the two-headed eagle to a native warrior's shield. The native shield is supposed to symbolize the Philippines resistance to colonization while the Santo Niño's coat of arms printed on its face represented the country's acceptance of Roman Catholicism.

References

External links

Sinulog.ph
Sinulog Foundation Working Committee

Cebuano culture
Cultural festivals in the Philippines
Visayan festivals
Roman Catholic festivals in the Philippines
Culture in Cebu City
Visayan culture
Tourist attractions in Cebu City
January observances
Holidays and observances by scheduling (nth weekday of the month)
Christian Sunday observances
Competitions in Cebu